A list of French-produced films scheduled for release in 2016.

2016

Notes

External links
 French films of 2016 at the Internet Movie Database
 2016 in France
 2016 in French television

French
2016
Films